David Vincent Hannam (born 10 May 1944) is an English former professional footballer who played as an outside right in the Football League for Brighton & Hove Albion., making his debut against Portsmouth in 1962.

He was signed by Billy Lane and played under George Curtis. Brighton & Hove failed to ward off relegation, however, and were demoted to the Fourth Division of English football at the end of the 1962-1963 season. He was sold by new manager, Archie McCaulay, as part of an end-of-season clear out.

He went on to play non-league football for Tunbridge Wells Rangers, Crawley Town, Hastings United and Southwick and in Australia for Victorian State League club Slavia. After twice breaking a leg while with Southwick, he retired from football and later went into business in Florida, where he currently resides.

References

1944 births
Living people
Footballers from Islington (district)
English footballers
Association football wingers
Brighton & Hove Albion F.C. players
Tunbridge Wells F.C. players
Slavia Melbourne players
Crawley Town F.C. players
Hastings United F.C. (1948) players
Southwick F.C. players
English Football League players
Southern Football League players
English expatriate footballers
English expatriate sportspeople in Australia
English expatriates in the United States